Orkun Kökçü (born 29 December 2000) is a Turkish professional footballer who plays as a midfielder for the Dutch club Feyenoord whom he captains in the Eredivisie. Born in the Netherlands, Kökçü represents Turkey internationally.

Club career
A youth product of FC Groningen, where he arrived after having played for local clubs around his hometown Haarlem, Kökçü joined the Feyenoord youth academy in 2014. He made his debut for Feyenoord at the age of 17 in a 4–0 win over VV Gemert in the first round of the KNVB Cup on 17 September 2018, scoring Feyenoord's second goal. He made his Eredivisie debut against FC Emmen on 9 December 2018, and contributed with a goal and an assist after coming on as a substitute. On 10 April 2019, he extended his contract at Feyenoord until 2023. On 26 June 2020, he reached an agreement to extend his contract with Feyenoord for another two years, a deal to the end of the 2024–25 season.

Following Jens Toornstra's departure, Feyenoord head coach Arne Slot chose Kökçü as his club captain on 2 September 2022.

International career
Kökçü was a youth international for the Netherlands, having represented the Netherlands U18s, and Netherlands U19s. In July 2019 Kökçü announced the intent to play for the Turkish national team. He represented the Turkey U21s in a 3–2 2021 UEFA European Under-21 Championship qualification loss to the England U21s on 6 September 2019.

He made his Turkey national team debut on 6 September 2020 in a Nations League game against Serbia, he started the game and played the first hour of the 0–0 away draw.

Personal life
Born in the Netherlands, Kökçü is of Turkish and Azerbaijani descent. He is the younger brother of the professional footballer Ozan Kökçü. He is a lifelong fan of  Beşiktaş and in the future he wants to play for the club he's been supporting since childhood.

Career statistics

Club

International

Scores and results list Turkey's goal tally first.

Honours
Feyenoord
 Johan Cruyff Shield: 2018
 UEFA Europa Conference League runner-up: 2021–22

Individual
 Eredivisie Talent of the Month: December 2019; March 2021
Eredivisie Player of the Month: January 2022; February 2022

References

External links
 Career stats - Voetbal International
 
 
 

Living people
2000 births
Footballers from Haarlem
Turkish footballers
Dutch footballers
Association football midfielders
Turkey international footballers
Turkey under-21 international footballers
UEFA Euro 2020 players
Netherlands youth international footballers
Feyenoord players
Eredivisie players